An Irish Christmas is a music album by Irish musician Moya Brennan. According to Moya, the idea for the album first came to her some time ago: "I've been involved in number of other people's Christmas projects in recent years," explains Moya, "but I wanted to capture a truly Celtic Christmas feeling." "It's always important to bring the meaning of Christmas to the fore. It is the essence of what I believe in and the album offers both celebration and reflection on that familiar theme."

Track listing
 "Carol of the Bells"
 "The Wexford Carol"
 "Deck the Halls"
 "Do You Hear (What I Hear)" / "Don Oíche Úd i mBeithil"
 "God Rest Ye Merry Gentlemen"
 "Gabriel's Message
 "Joy to the World
 "I Still Believe" 
 "In the Bleak Midwinter"
 "Love Came Down at Christmas" 
 "In Dulci Jubilo"
 "Oíche Chiúin (Silent Night)"
  Replaced on U.S. release with "What Child Is This?" and "Angels We Have Heard on High" respectively.

In 2013, An Irish Christmas was re-issued and re-packaged with two new tracks: "Dia Do Bheatha", "We Three Kings", a reworking of "Codail A Leanbh" and "What Child Is This" which previously appeared only on the US edition of the album.

Promotional singles
 "Carol of the Bells"

Personnel

Band
 Moya Brennan – vocals, harp, keyboards
 Paul Byrne – drums, bodhran, timpani, tubular bells, percussion
 Fionan De Barra – guitars, bouzouki, keyboards, vocals
 Cormac De Barra – harp, vocals
 Éamonn Galldubh – Uilleann pipes, whistles, flute
 Yoshinobi Izumi – electric bass
 Sam Jackson – piano, keyboards
 Sinéad Madden – fiddle, vocals
 Frances Mitchell – keyboards

Additional musicians
 Máire Breatnach – viola, fiddle
 Anthony Drennan – electric and acoustic guitars, dobro
 Úna Ní Chanainn – cello
 Tim Jarvis – keyboards
 Aisling and Paul Jarvis – vocals on "Oíche Chiúin"

Release details
 Ireland and UK: 18 November 2005

External links
 Joy to the World video

Moya Brennan albums
2005 Christmas albums
Christmas albums by Irish artists
Celtic Christmas albums